Vale do Rio Doce is one of the twelve mesoregions of the Brazilian state of Minas Gerais. It is composed of 102 municipalities, distributed across 7 microregions.

Demography

See also 

 1967 Rio Doce State Park wildfire

References 

Mesoregions of Minas Gerais